Robert Alexander Stewart "Robin" Barbour  (11 May 1921 – 18 October 2014) was a Church of Scotland minister and an author.

Robin Barbour was born on 11 May 1921 in Edinburgh to George Freeland Barbour and Helen Hepburne-Scott. His father, the laird of Bonskeid, Pitlochry, was a distinguished philosopher and theologian. Initially he was educated at Cargilfield Preparatory School in Edinburgh then at Rugby.

He joined Balliol College, Oxford, before the outbreak of World War II, during which he served in the Italian campaign with Scottish Horse. Barbour was awarded the Military Cross in recognition of his distinguished service during the war.

After the war, Barbour graduated from Balliol with a double first in classics and philosophy. He first obtained a teaching qualification in Edinburgh before studying divinity at the University of St Andrews, and later studying also at Yale University.

A minister since 1954, he was for many years a lecturer in divinity at the University of Edinburgh and Professor of New Testament Exegesis at the University of Aberdeen from 1971 to 1982. He was elected Moderator of the General Assembly of the Church of Scotland from 1979 to 1980 and was the youngest in living memory to be appointed.

In 1981, Barbour was appointed Dean of the Chapel Royal in Scotland and served this ministry until 1991. An Honorary Chaplain to the Queen, he was also a chaplain of the Order of St John of Jerusalem.

Barbour married in 1950 and had four children. He retired in 1986, remaining active in church ministry. He died on 18 October 2014 in Perth, Scotland.

References

1921 births
2014 deaths
21st-century Ministers of the Church of Scotland
People educated at Cargilfield School
People educated at Rugby School
Alumni of Balliol College, Oxford
20th-century Ministers of the Church of Scotland
Academics of the University of Edinburgh
Academics of the University of Aberdeen
Moderators of the General Assembly of the Church of Scotland
Deans of the Chapel Royal in Scotland
Knights Commander of the Royal Victorian Order
Recipients of the Military Cross
Honorary Chaplains to the Queen
Chaplains of the Order of St John
Scottish military chaplains
Scottish Calvinist and Reformed theologians
Scottish Horse officers
Military personnel from Edinburgh